BS15 may refer to:
BS15, a BS postcode area for Bristol, England
Bonomi BS.15 Bigiarella, a glider
BS-15 Sar Gavia, a Spanish Maritime Safety and Rescue Society tugboat	
BS 15 Specification for Structural Steel for Bridges, etc., a British Standard
BS15, a left-hand threaded valve for gas cylinders